David Hernandez (born in 1971) is an American poet and novelist. Most recently, he was awarded a 2011 National Endowment for the Arts Fellowship for Poetry.

Life
His poems have appeared in FIELD, The Threepenny Review, Ploughshares, The Missouri Review, Kenyon Review, TriQuarterly, The Southern Review, Shade, Poetry Daily, AGNI, Epoch, Iowa Review, Pleiades.  His drawings have appeared in Indiana Review.

His father Jaime A. Hernandez, migrated from Colombia to the United States at a young age; his mother Nancy Cornejo is originally from Chile. David is the descendant of a long line of poets dating back to the 1870s, the Gamboa family, and he was included in the book Los Gamboa: una Dinastía de Poetas  published in 2008. The book has five of David's poems translated in Spanish by the book's author, Hugo Cuevas-Mohr

He teaches poetry at California State University, Long Beach, and teaches creative writing at California State University, Fullerton. He lives in Long Beach, California.

Awards
 2011 National Endowment for the Arts Fellowship for Poetry.
 2010 Kathyrn A. Morton Prize in Poetry
 2005 Crab Orchard Series in Poetry

Works

Poetry Books
 Dear, Sincerely, University of Pittsburgh Press (2016)
 Hoodwinked, Sarabande Books (2011)
 Always Danger, Southern Illinois University Press (2006)
 A House Waiting for Music, Tupelo Press (2003)

YA Novels
 No More Us for You, HarperCollins (2009)
 Suckerpunch, HarperCollins (2008)

References

External links
 "Author's website"

1971 births
Living people
American male poets
California State University, Long Beach faculty
21st-century American poets
21st-century American male writers